Kothar may refer to:

 Kothar-wa-Khasis, a Canaanite god
 Kothar, a character created by Gardner Fox
 Kothaar, a member of the heavy metal band Bathory